António João Neto, nicknamed Miúdo Neto (born October 10, 1971) is a retired Angolan football player. He has played for Angolan side Primeiro de Agosto as well as for the Angolan national team.

National team statistics

References

1971 births
Living people
Angolan footballers

Association football midfielders
Angola international footballers
C.D. Primeiro de Agosto players